Melissa Lane is a full professor of politics at Princeton University, a position she has held since 2009. Prior to this, she was a Senior Research Fellow of King's College, Cambridge and Associate Director of their Centre for History and Economics. She was a lecturer at Cambridge from 1994 to 2009. Her expertise is in political theory.

Academic career
She graduated from Harvard University 'summa cum laude' with a degree in Social Studies. As a Marshall, Truman, and Phi Beta Kappa scholar, Lane went on to earn an M.Phil. and Ph.D. in Philosophy from Cambridge where she was a Marshall Scholar.

Publications

Books
 Plato’s Progeny: How Socrates and Plato still captivate the modern mind. Duckworth, 2001. Reviewed in
Bryn Mawr Classical Reviews,
Heythrop Journal,
Mind, 
Times Literary Supplement, 
Greece and Rome,
Philosophy in Review,  
Phronesis, 
Prudentia, 
Review of Politics,  
Method and Politics in Plato's Statesman. Cambridge University Press, 1998. Reviewed in 
Polis
Athenaeum
Archives de Philosophie, 
Classical Review, 
Classical World 
Ethicsw
Greece and Rome
Heythrop Journal 
Journal of the History of Philosophy, 
Review of Metaphysics
Phronesis.
 Greek and Roman Political Ideas (Pelican Books, 2014) .

Peer-reviewed journal articles
(selected)
"The evolution of eironeia in classical Greek texts: why Socratic eironeia is not Socratic irony", Oxford Studies in Ancient Philosophy 31 (2006) 49–83.
"Argument and Agreement in Plato’s Crito", History of Political Thought 19:3 (1998) 313–330.   
"The utopianism of Hamilton’s state of needs: on rights, deliberation, and the nature of politics", South African Journal of Philosophy 25 (2006) 207–213.  
"Why History of Ideas At All?", History of European Ideas 28:1–2 (2002) 33–41.  
"States of Nature, Epistemic and Political", Proceedings of the Aristotelian Society (1998–1999)  1–24.
"Plato, Popper, Strauss, and Utopianism: Open Secrets?", History of Philosophy Quarterly 16:2 (April 1999) 119-42

Honours
 Fellow of the Royal Historical Society

References

External links 
University of Cambridge – Core Faculty

Princeton University faculty
Living people
American scholars of ancient Greek philosophy
Historians of political thought
Fellows of the Royal Historical Society
Harvard University alumni
Alumni of the University of Cambridge
Year of birth missing (living people)
Women political scientists
Marshall Scholars